The Thomas Gould Jr. House is a historic house located at 402 Lynn Drive in Ventura, California. Architect Henry Mather Greene designed the American Craftsman style California bungalow, which was built in 1924. The house is considered one of the best examples of Henry Greene's independent work; most of his other designs were created alongside his brother Charles as Greene & Greene. The two-story house has a wood frame and redwood siding and window casings. The gable roof features truncated ends and a small gable on the front side which resembles a dormer. The house's interior decorations include ceiling moldings, a leaded glass china cabinet, and a carved mirror, the latter being the only piece of furniture designed by Greene himself.

The historic residence was listed on the National Register of Historic Places in 2005.

See also
Bungalow
Arts and Crafts Movement
List of Registered Historic Places in Ventura County, California

References

External links
 , The Gould Residence
 City of Ventura. "FAQs Concerning Historic  Resources and Surveys". Historic Preservation webpage.

Houses in Ventura County, California
Buildings and structures in Ventura, California
Houses on the National Register of Historic Places in California
National Register of Historic Places in Ventura, California
American Craftsman architecture in California
Bungalow architecture in California
Greene and Greene buildings